Rui Machado was the defending champion, but he lost in the final 5–7, 2–6 against Oleksandr Dolgopolov Jr.

Seeds

Draw

Finals

Top half

Bottom half

External links
Main Draw
Qualifying Draw

Morocco Tennis Tour - Meknes - Singles
2010 Singles
2010 Morocco Tennis Tour